Walking Street is an entertainment and red-light district in the city of Pattaya, Thailand. The street is a tourist attraction which draws foreigners and Thai nationals, primarily for its night life. The Walking Street area includes seafood restaurants, live music venues, beer bars, discothèques, sports bars, go-go bars, nightclubs and hotels.  Also on the street, tourists are often offered the opportunity to watch a variety of sex shows, for example, including sexual acts between performers of the show.

The area is closed to vehicles from 19:00 until 03:00. Car and motorcycle parking is provided at the Bali Hai end. Although the closing time of the bars and clubs is officially 04:00, some stay open later illegally.

Walking Street is in Pattaya city. A large video sign was erected in March 2010 at the Beach Road entrance The street has numerous bars, restaurants and attractions which advertise using bright large neon signs. Pattaya authorities began cracking down on oversized signs in 2015 in an effort to improve accessibility on Walking Street for emergency vehicles.

Prostitution
In addition to a large number of institutions offering sexual entertainment, a significant number of prostitutes, both girls and gay men, work on the street. Although prostitution in Thailand is illegal, there are estimated to be 27,000 prostitutes working in Pattaya, many in Walking Street.

Many of the prostitutes work as bargirls in the bars and clubs along the street. Their clients are often required to pay a bar fine to take them out of the bar.

In 2016, Thailand's first female Minister of Tourism, Kobkarn Wattanavrangkul, announced that Thailand was "closed to the sex trade" following adverse coverage in foreign media. In Pattaya, the aim was to push prostitution back to beyond Second Street, leaving the areas near the beach a family-friendly tourist area. Although there have been many police raids and crackdowns, the sex trade continues in Walking Street.

Gallery

References

External links

Neighbourhoods of Pattaya
Red-light districts in Thailand
Tourist attractions in Chonburi province